Meditation on Violence is a 1948 American 16 mm black and white experimental short film directed by Maya Deren. It explores in playing out the movements and performance of the Wu-tang ritual.  It also obscures the distinction between violence and beauty. The film stars Chao-Li Chi and music by Teiji Ito.

Cast
 Chao-Li Chi - Himself

References

External links

1948 short films
1948 films
Experimental film
American silent short films
Films directed by Maya Deren
1940s American films